The Charleston Sandsharks were a professional indoor football team based in North Charleston, South Carolina, a suburb of the metropolitan area of Charleston, South Carolina, with home games at the North Charleston Coliseum. The team played in the National Indoor Football League (NIFL) for 2006. The team left the NIFL and announced they were joining the World Indoor Football League for 2007 before withdrawing from the start-up league. They then were announced as members of the American Indoor Football Association as the Carolina Sandsharks, but the owners decided to not play for financial reasons.

The Charleston Sandsharks qualified for the NIFL playoffs in 2006, but ownership opted not to participate due to financial struggles.

Season-by-season records

|-
|2006 || 7 || 7 || 0 || 3rd AC Eastern || —

External links
 Sandsharks Homepage

Sports in Charleston, South Carolina
American football teams in South Carolina
2006 establishments in South Carolina
American football teams established in 2006